Jack Near (born October 26, 1992 in Bronxville, New York) is lacrosse player for the Dallas Rattlers in Major League Lacrosse. Near currently starts as a defensive midfielder for Dallas. Near was announced as signing with the Premier Lacrosse League.

High school career 
At Bronxville High School, Jack played for the Varsity Lacrosse team for 4 years. Jack was a standout all-around midfielder, although he was recruited for his skills on defense.

College career
At Notre Dame Near played as a short stick defensive midfielder where he appeared in 48 games gathering 19 points.

Professional MLL career
Jack Near was selected with the 7th pick of the first round by the Rochester Rattlers in the 2015 Major League Lacrosse Collegiate Draft. In his rookie season Near played in 5 regular season games and managed to score 3 goals. During the playoffs Near played in 2 games and scored a single goal in the Rattlers run to the championship. Near moved with the team to Dallas. In 2018 he appeared in 12 games and picked up 5 goals, 1 2pt goal, 2 assist, and 12 ground balls.

References

1992 births
Living people
Rochester Rattlers players
Dallas Rattlers players
American lacrosse players
Lacrosse players from New York (state)
People from Bronxville, New York
Sportspeople from Westchester County, New York
Notre Dame Fighting Irish men's lacrosse players
Lacrosse midfielders